Tunnel 18 is a 1997 Iranian Historical drama film written and directed by Hossein Shahabi.

Starring
 Ali Osivand
 Reza Naji
 Bahar Karimzadeh
 Karim Nobakht
 Abdolsamad Jodeyri
 Akram Alamdar
 Mansoor Sedaghat

Crew
 cinematography: Hamid Angaji
 Sound Recorder:Saman Alizadeh
 Costume Designer: Reza Hasanzadeh
 Makeup designer: Navid Farahmarzi
 Music: Hossein Shahabi
 Assistsnts Director: Mohammad Ravandi - Sanaz Shakoori
 Production manager: karim Nobakht
 producer: Hossein Shahabi
 produced in Baran film house Iran 1997

References

1997 films
Iranian drama films
Films directed by Hossein Shahabi